The 2011 Challenger DCNS de Cherbourg was a professional tennis tournament played on indoor hard courts. It was the 18th edition of the tournament which is part of the 2011 ATP Challenger Tour. It took place in Cherbourg, France between February 28 and March 6, 2011.

ATP entrants

Seeds

 Rankings are as of February 21, 2011.

Other entrants
The following players received wildcards into the singles main draw:
  Kenny de Schepper
  Jonathan Eysseric
  Benoît Paire
  Alexandre Sidorenko

The following players received entry as a Special Exempt into the singles main draw:
  Stefan Seifert

The following players received entry from the qualifying draw:
  Niels Desein
  Jan Mertl
  Matwé Middelkoop
  Maxime Teixeira

Champions

Singles

 Grigor Dimitrov def.  Nicolas Mahut, 6–2, 7–6(7–4)

Doubles

 Pierre-Hugues Herbert /  Nicolas Renavand def.  Nicolas Mahut /  Édouard Roger-Vasselin, 3–6, 6–4 [10–5]

External links
Official Website
ITF Search
ATP official site

2011 ATP Challenger Tour
Hard court tennis tournaments
2011 in French tennis
February 2011 sports events in France
March 2011 sports events in France
2011